Manuel José da Luz Correia Curto (born 9 July 1986) is a Portuguese former professional footballer who played as a midfielder.

Club career
Born in Torres Vedras, Lisbon District, Curto spent seven years in S.L. Benfica's youth system, where he operated as a forward. In the following years, however, he played in a more defensive position.

After several seasons in the lower leagues, Curto joined G.D. Estoril Praia in the Segunda Liga. In the 2010–11 campaign he made his Primeira Liga debut with Associação Naval 1º de Maio, his first match in the competition occurring on 24 September 2010 as he played nine minutes in a 3–1 away loss against S.C. Braga.

On 20 March 2011, Curto scored twice from the penalty kick spot to help hosts Naval come from behind 0–2 to earn a 2–2 draw against S.C. Beira-Mar, but the Figueira da Foz club eventually suffered relegation, returning to the second division after a six-year stay. He met the same fate in 2011–12 with his following team, U.D. Leiria.

References

External links

1986 births
Living people
People from Torres Vedras
Sportspeople from Lisbon District
Portuguese footballers
Association football midfielders
Primeira Liga players
Liga Portugal 2 players
Segunda Divisão players
S.L. Benfica B players
S.C.U. Torreense players
C.D. Pinhalnovense players
G.D. Estoril Praia players
Associação Naval 1º de Maio players
U.D. Leiria players
Atlético Clube de Portugal players
Segunda División B players
Kazakhstan Premier League players
FC Taraz players
Ekstraklasa players
Zagłębie Lubin players
Belgian Pro League players
Lierse S.K. players
Portugal youth international footballers
Portuguese expatriate footballers
Expatriate footballers in Spain
Expatriate footballers in Kazakhstan
Expatriate footballers in Poland
Expatriate footballers in Belgium
Portuguese expatriate sportspeople in Spain
Portuguese expatriate sportspeople in Poland
Portuguese expatriate sportspeople in Belgium